Khalid bin Muhammad Al-Rashed (born 1970) Saudi Islamic preacher, Salafist, was the imam and preacher of the Fahd bin Muflih Al-Subaie Mosque in Al-Khobar. He was also the general supervisor of the returnees’ and returnees’ convoys site. In a famous sermon entitled “O Ummah of Muhammad,” in which he defended the Messenger of God, may God's prayers and peace be upon him, and protested against the insulting cartoons of the Prophet Muhammad, and demanded the abolition of the Danish embassy. The Saudi government tried him with imprisonment for 15 years, in September 2005 AD, and his sentence ended in 2020. He was released and then sentenced to another 17 years in prison, bringing the total number of years of detention to 40 years.

References

1970 births
Sunni fiqh scholars
Islamic studies scholars
Saudi Arabian Salafis
20th-century imams
Living people